Imjonseong Fortress is a historic site located in Yesan County, South Chungcheong Province, South Korea. It is designated on January 21, 1963 under number 90.

The fortress was built by Baekje, one of the Three Kingdoms of Korea, as an outpost, presumably against the invasion of Goguryeo. It was located at the top of the mountain and was surrounded by a thick wall reinforced by stone.

Currently, only remains of two gates, of a well, and of an unidentified building are present on the site.

References

Historic Sites of South Korea
Castles in South Korea
Yesan County